Dry Borren (French: Trois-Fontaines; Latin: Tres Fontes) is a historic site in the Sonian Forest in the municiaplity Auderghem, Belgium. It was originally a hunting lodge of the dukes of Brabant, built on a site where three springs originated.

History
The first mention dates from 1321 and speaks of a hermitage. However, there was also a keep, founded by John II of Brabant. 

The castle is mentioned under the name of Trois-Fontaines (Dryen Borren or Drie Borne) in 1329. 

In the Brabantsche Yeesten it is told that Duke John III brought here a pot of metal after the successful Siege of Valkenburg (1329). He also used the place for big game hunting. John had a tower and a square built in the hamlet by the name of Dry Borren in 1329.

In the last year of his life he founded here a chapel dedicated to the Blessed Virgin Mary and to Saint Catherine. The site also served as a prison. Poachers and wood gatherers were imprisoned here, but also robbers and political prisoners. Such practice is first documented from 1373. Dry Borren was also the residence of the Forest Judge (Dutch: Bosrechter).

In 1429 Wein van Cotthem became chaplain here. He probably also lived here and it is here that he wrote his sequel to the Brabantsche Yeesten. The church lost its benefice in 1446 to Saint-Jacques-sur-Coudenberg.

In 1446, the people of Liège were imprisoned at Dry Borren, but they escaped and the Brabant council granted them letters of safe-conduct so that they could come to Brussels and assert their rights.

During the Wars of Religion, the domain was looted and destroyed. It was rebuilt under Philip II of Spain, and a group of about thirty men, including horsemen, was assigned to patrol the domain. The prison was re-established. 

In 1659, a "bakehouse" was added. Around 1730, the Waversesteenweg, which ended at the Dry Borren, was extended to Jezus-Eik. In 1793 the office of Bosrechter and the prison were abolished. The site came under the Dutch Société générale des Pays-Bas by order of William I of the Netherlands in 1822. Soon, the dilapidated tower was demolished. The remains were sold via public sale. In 1825 the gate keep was demolished with some difficulty. 

Starting from this period Dry Borren was designated as "farm" in documents until the Belgian state took ownership in 1906. Thereafter the site was turned into a "forest house" or boswachtershuis, with a forest worker and his family living here for a while. There was a work of restoration between 1973 and 1976. Thereafter, the non-profit association Le Conseil des Trois-Fontaines kept the residence and used the building as an exhibition space for some time.

Dry Borren forest castle was protected by royal decree in November 1986. The Belgian State transferred ownership to the Brussels Region in 1991. It has been in disuse since 2008.

Description
Only the foundations of the castle tower have been preserved. The adjacent building is more or less in the state it was rebuilt at the end of the 16th century. Inside there is a monumental Gothic fireplace. The basement where the dungeons were located has also been preserved.

Iconography
 1532. The castle appears on the tapestry dedicated to the month of April from the series called Les Belles Chasses de Maximilien.
 1659. Lucas Vorsterman the Younger (1624-1667) Castrum trium fontium, vulgo Dry Borren, engraving, representation of the castle in 1659.
 Engraved by Jacobus Harrewijn (1660-1727) and inserted in Christophe Butkens (1591-1650), Supplément aux Trophées tant sacrés que profanes du Duché de Brabant (...), The Hague, Chrétien van Lom, 1726.
 1659. Old engraving published by Antoon Sanders (1586-1664).
 19th century.  (1761–1838, son of Ignaz Vitzthumb), Vue du chastel dit Dry Borren.

References

Castles in Brussels
Nature reserves in Belgium
Auderghem